Eysines Cantinolle tram stop is a stop on the Bordeaux tramway in the commune of Eysines, France. It is the current northwestern terminus of Bordeaux Tramway Line D and opened on 29 February 2020.

Services 
The following services stop at Cantinolle:

References

Tram stops in Eysines
Bordeaux tramway stops
Railway stations in France opened in 2020